Marshall County Airport  is a county-owned, public-use airport in Marshall County, Illinois, United States. It is located one nautical mile (2 km) east of the central business district of Lacon, Illinois. This airport is included in the National Plan of Integrated Airport Systems for 2011–2015, which categorized it as a general aviation facility.

Facilities and aircraft 
Marshall County Airport covers an area of 230 acres (93 ha) at an elevation of 568 feet (173 m) above mean sea level. It has two runways with asphalt surfaces: 13/31 is 3,200 by 75 feet (975 x 23 m) and 18/36 is 2,200 by 50 feet (671 x 15 m).

The airport has an FBO offering fuel as well as aircraft parking and hangars, a passenger terminal, courtesy cars, a pilot lounge, snooze rooms, and a public phone. There is a flying club at the airport offering flight instruction and aircraft rental.

For the 12-month period ending December 31, 2008, the airport had 19,000 aircraft operations, an average of 52 per day: 93% general aviation, 5% air taxi, and 2% military. At that time there were 42 aircraft based at this airport, all airplanes: 41 single-engine and 1 multi-engine.

References

External links 
 Aerial image as of April 1998 from USGS The National Map
 

Airports in Illinois
Buildings and structures in Marshall County, Illinois